Denis Delfino (died 1626) was a Roman Catholic prelate who served as Bishop of Vicenza (1606–1626).

Biography
On 19 Jun 1606, Denis Delfino was appointed during the papacy of Pope Paul V as Bishop of Vicenza.
On 2 Jul 1606, he was consecrated bishop by Giovanni Delfino, Cardinal-Priest of San Marco, with Fabio Biondi, Titular Patriarch of Jerusalem, and Metello Bichi, Bishop Emeritus of Sovana, serving as co-consecrators.
He served as Bishop of Vicenza until his death in 1626.

References

External links and additional sources
 (for Chronology of Bishops) 
 (for Chronology of Bishops) 

17th-century Italian Roman Catholic bishops
Bishops appointed by Pope Paul V
1626 deaths